Joseph Charles Linder (August 12, 1886 in Hancock, Michigan – June 28, 1948) was an American ice hockey player. Linder played for the Portage Lakes Hockey Club, which was considered one of the best American teams at the time. He led his team to a victory over the Winnipeg Victorias, which marked the first time an American team had ever beaten them. Linder was instrumental in the victory. As a reporter put it after the game, "Linder stood out as one of the greatest men I have ever seen on ice". Linder has also been referred as the “first great American-born hockey player". After he retired, he went into the grocery store business. He died at home in 1948. He was inducted into the United States Hockey Hall of Fame in 1974.

References

External links
 United States Hockey Hall of Fame bio

1886 births
1948 deaths
Ice hockey players from Michigan
People from Hancock, Michigan
Portage Lakes Hockey Club players
United States Hockey Hall of Fame inductees
American men's ice hockey defensemen